The mayor of Whanganui (previously Wanganui) is the head of the Whanganui District Council. Since 1872, there have been 29 mayors. Andrew Tripe is the current mayor.

History
The Wanganui Town Board was first formed in 1862, and its first chairman was J Handley who served in that capacity until 1864. The board became a borough council in 1872 until 1924, when Wanganui was granted city status and the mayor was the head of the Wanganui City Council. It continued as a city council until 1989, when Wanganui's city charter was cancelled. Local government reform of 1989 amalgamated various city and council councils – Wanganui District Council includes the old Wanganui City Council, Wanganui County Council and a part of the Waitotara County Council.  The motto of the then Wanganui City, and now Wanganui District Council, is 'Sans Dieu Rien' ('Without God, we are nothing').

The first meeting of the Wanganui Council was held on 14 February 1872. Councillor Francis Williamson, who was the last chairman of the town board, proposed councillor William Hogg Watt as the first mayor, which was seconded by councillor Nathan and carried unanimously. Other councillors who attended this first meeting were John Duthie, Jones and Bett. At the end of the first term, Watt was re-elected for another term. Watt resigned from the role on 12 September 1873.

Five days later, councillor William Hutchison was elected the second mayor of Wanganui. Hutchison resigned on 6 February 1874, as he had moved to Wellington to start another newspaper there. He remained his seat as a Councillor.

Several weeks and many attempted council meetings went by without a new mayor being elected, mostly because some councillors stayed away so that there was no quorum. Finally, on 10 April 1874, Robert Pharazyn was elected as the third mayor of Wanganui.

Edward Churton retired from his mayoralty on 15 December 1875. Churton died on 25 July 1885.

Watt succeeded Churton in 1875 and started the second period of his mayoralty.

James Laird was mayor from 1886 to 1888. He died on 3 September 1902.

Alfred John Parsons was mayor for two separate periods, first from 1888 to 1890 and then in 1891–1892. Parsons died on 15 July 1900. Henry Nathan was mayor between the two periods covered by Parsons.

Edward Liffiton was mayor in 1912. In 1916, a modifying order was gazetted so that he could be buried at Heads Road Cemetery. He died in 1923.

Wanganui's most controversial mayor, by far, was well regarded lawyer Charles MacKay who was found guilty of the attempted murder of poet D'Arcy Cresswell – a charge stemming from an attempt to allegedly blackmail Mayor MacKay for homosexual advances. MacKay was arrested, pleaded guilty and imprisoned. He was released from prison in 1927, travelled to England and became a journalist. He was killed in 1929 during riots in Munich, Germany whilst reporting the civil unrest.

Edward Alan Millward OBE was mayor from 1953 to 1962. He retired in 1962. He was succeeded by Reg Andrews OBE of the Labour Party; Andrews retired in 1974. Ron Russell QSO succeeded him and retired in 1983.

The 1983 mayoralty was won by Doug Turney, with Chas Poynter coming second. Poynter was made deputy mayor in 1983 as a consequence. Poynter had served on the Wanganui council from 1977. In 1986, Poynter challenged Turney and was successful, winning with a majority of 1529 votes. In 1989, Poynter increased his majority, defeating challenger John Blaikie by almost 6,000 votes. This was the first election under the new local government boundaries with Wanganui City incorporating Wanganui County and some of Waitotara County. Blaikie was the chairman of the Wanganui County Council prior to the reorganisation. The new territorial authority was named Wanganui District Council.

In 1992, Poynter was challenged by Wanganui greengrocer Randhir Dahya, a popular Indian businessman. His majority was cut to just 939 votes. Dahya challenged him twice more, in 1995 and 1998, but Poynter easily resisted these challenges, assisted by his handling of the Moutoa Gardens occupation of 1995 and the unfortunate death of his wife, Joy, four months prior to the 1998 election. By 2001, the writing was on the wall and he regained the mayoralty with just 27% of the vote, warding off four councillor challengers. In 2004, he stood again and was defeated, polling third behind media personality Michael Laws and businessman John Martin with just 20% of the vote.

Laws did not stand again in the 2010 local elections, and Annette Main was elected, to take office in October 2010. Main narrowly defeated Dot McKinnon, who had been deputy-mayor under Laws. Main is the 27th mayor of Wanganui and the first woman to hold the office.

List of mayors of W(h)anganui
The following list shows the 29 mayors of Wanganui:

See also
Mayor of Palmerston North
Mayor of Rangitikei

References

External links

 Photo of Charles Ewing Mackay in 1913 (copyright will expire on 1 January 2014)